Angela is a 1978 Canadian drama film directed by Boris Sagal and starring Sophia Loren and Steve Railsback.

Premise
A war veteran finds out that a former prostitute had his baby.  Doubting it's his, he gives it away, so she reports him. Twenty years later, she still wants to find her son. She meets a young man and falls in love, but the veteran's prison term ends.

Cast

References

External links
 

1978 films
1978 drama films
Canadian drama films
English-language Canadian films
Films scored by Henry Mancini
Films about prostitution in Canada
Films directed by Boris Sagal
Films shot in Montreal
Incest in film
1970s English-language films
1970s Canadian films